Thornbury railway station may refer to:

Thornbury (Gloucestershire) railway station in England
Thornbury railway station, Melbourne in Australia